Fatima Ahmed (born 1949, Phnom Penh) is an Italian-Somali writer.

Early life
Fatima Ahmed was born in Phnom Penh, capital of Cambodia, in 1949. Her father was a Somali sailor and her mother was of Vietnamese ancestry. Because of the civil war in Cambodia, the family of Fatima Ahmed sought shelter in Somalia. While they were there, Ahmed was engaged in radio programs, including being a guest speaker at Radio Mogadishu. They later on migrated to Italy. In Italy, she was mainly engaged in cultural mediation and as a Vietnamese-language interpreter.

Biography 
She later became a writer and cultural mediator who actively participated in meetings, seminars, conferences and cultural activities concerning post-colonial identity. Her writing was mostly about post-colonial experiences. She has collaborated with the EKS & TRA association in literature works as well as dealing with migration. Her publications include Il Ritorno, Shanti (for which she received a medal from the Presidency of the Italian Republic) and Gocce di ricordi, which also won literary prizes. Aukuí was her first novel. She has three children with an Italian husband. They have lived in Lake Maggiore since 1989.

References

Somalian novelists
Somalian women novelists
Somalian expatriates in Italy
Somalian people of Vietnamese descent
People from Phnom Penh
1949 births
Living people
20th-century Somalian women writers
20th-century Somalian writers
21st-century Somalian women writers
21st-century Somalian writers